Disraeli, also called Disraeli: Portrait of a Romantic, is a 1978 four-part British serial about the great statesman and Prime Minister of the United Kingdom, Benjamin Disraeli. It was produced by Associated Television and aired on ITV. 

With a screenplay by David Butler, it stars Ian McShane and was directed by Claude Whatham. Spanning five decades of Disraeli's life, the serial focuses as much on Disraeli's personal life as it does on his political persona. 

Filmed on site in England, the miniseries received an Emmy nomination for Outstanding Limited Series after being broadcast in the US in 1980 as part of Masterpiece Theatre under the title Disraeli: Portrait of a Romantic.

Plot 
As the series starts, Disraeli is a Byronic world traveler who has published two novels but is struggling with debt. He tries making connections in high society, and eventually runs for office several times, albeit unsuccessfully. 

Much of his personal life is covered, and his more successful involvement with politics starts in the second episode, which ends with his being sworn in as Chancellor of the Exchequer. 

The rest of the series chronicles his rise to power, the death of his wife, and his two terms as Prime Minister.

Cast 
Ian McShane     - as Benjamin Disraeli
Mary Peach      - as Mary Anne Disraeli
Rosemary Leach  - as Queen Victoria
John Carlisle - as William Ewart Gladstone
Jeremy Clyde    - as John Manners, 7th Duke of Rutland
Brett Usher         - as Edward Bulwer-Lytton, 1st Baron Lytton
Brewster Mason  - as Chancellor Bismarck
Antony Brown        - as Sir Robert Peel
David de Keyser - as Lionel de Rothschild
David Wood - as Edward Smith-Stanley, 14th Earl of Derby
John Gregg          - as Robert Cecil, 3rd Marquess of Salisbury
Brendan Barry       - as Stafford Northcote, 1st Earl of Iddesleigh
Mark Dignam     - as John Copley, 1st Baron Lyndhurst
Patrick Drury   - as Montagu Corry, 1st Baron Rowton
Peter Hughes - as Philip Rose
Leigh Lawson    - as Alfred Guillaume Gabriel, Count D'Orsay
Peter Miles     - as Lord Henry Lennox
David Riley         - as George Smythe, 7th Viscount Strangford
Anton Rodgers   - as Lord George Bentinck
William Russell - as Wyndham Lewis
Aubrey Morris   - Isaac Disraeli
Maria Charles - as Maria Disraeli (wife of Isaac Disraeli and mother of Benjamin Disraeli)
Margaret Whiting - as Lady Blessington
Patricia Hodge - as Rosina Bulwer Lytton

Reception
The miniseries was widely praised. The American television magazine Panorama wrote that "McShane captures the inner contradictions of the man" and "It says a lot for Ian McShane's performance in this television series that he brings out both the likeable and the questionable qualities in Disraeli's character."

The miniseries was broadcast in the U.S. on PBS's Masterpiece Theatre in 1980 and was subsequently nominated for the Emmy Award for Outstanding Limited Series.

In 1980 screenwriter David Butler also published a book based on the series, titled Disraeli: Portrait of a Romantic, via Warner Books.

References

External links

Television series set in the 1830s
Television series set in the 19th century
Cultural depictions of Benjamin Disraeli
ITV television dramas
1978 British television series debuts
1978 British television series endings
1970s British drama television series
Television series by ITV Studios
Works about prime ministers of the United Kingdom
1978 in politics
Television shows produced by Associated Television (ATV)
English-language television shows